Sebastian Graham-Jones (Peter Sebastian Graham-Jones) (1 August,  1947 – 18 July, 2004) was a British actor and director known for such films and television series as Ace of Wands, Travelling Man, Because of the Cats, The Little Drummer Girl and Shadow of the Noose.  Jones was also a theatre director and musician.  He died of cancer at the age of 56.

Footnotes

References

External links

Male actors from Dorset
English male film actors
English theatre directors
English television directors
English male television actors
English male stage actors
2014 deaths
1947 births